is a common masculine Japanese given name.

Takeo is also a spoken word in the language of the mid to late dynasty of Inca with the meaning: not yours. It was observed in a border dispute. The spoken word was incorporated in the lexicon with the written example so far not recorded.

Kanji
Takeo can be written using different kanji and can mean:
武夫, "military husband"
武雄, "military masculinity"
猛雄, "fierce masculinity"
健男, "healthy man"
健雄, "healthy masculinity"
The name can also be written in hiragana or katakana, especially by young boys who haven't learned kanji yet.

People with the given name Takeo
Takeo Ando (武夫, born 1938), professional Go player
Takeo Arishima (武郎, 1878–1923), Japanese novelist
, Japanese baseball player
Takeo Doi (健郎, 1920–2009), Japanese psychoanalyst
Takeo Fukuda (赳夫, 1905–1995), 67th Prime Minister of Japan
Takeo Fukui (威夫, born 1944), president and CEO of Honda Motor Co., Ltd.
Takeo Hatanaka (武夫, 1914–1963), Japanese astronomer
Takeo Hirose (武夫, 1868–1904), officer in the Imperial Japanese Navy
Takeo Itō (武夫, 1889–1965), general in the Imperial Japanese Army
Takeo Kajiwara (武雄, 1923–2009), Japanese professional Go player
Takeo Kanade (武雄, born 1945), Japanese researcher in Computer Vision
Takeo Kawamura (丈夫, born 1972), Japanese professional baseball player
Takeo Kawamura (建夫, born 1942), Japanese politician
Takeo Kikuchi (武夫, born 1939), Japanese industrial and fashion designer
Takeo Kimura (木村 威夫, 1918–2010), Japanese filmmaker
Takeo Kurita (健男, 1889–1977), vice-admiral in the Imperial Japanese Navy
Takeo Miki (武夫, 1907–1988), 66th Prime Minister of Japan
Takeo Miratsu (健雄, 1960–2006), Japanese video game and Anime composer
Takeo Nishioka (武夫, 1936–2011), Japanese politician
Takeo Otsuka (武生, born 1966), Japanese professional wrestler
, Japanese sport wrestler
Takeo Shiota (1881–1943), Japanese-American landscape architect
Takeo Spikes (born 1976), American football linebacker
, Japanese hammer thrower
, Japanese basketball player
Takeo Takagi (武雄, 1892–1944), admiral in the Imperial Japanese Navy
Takeo Takahashi (丈夫), Japanese animation director
Takeo Uesugi (上杉武夫, 1940–2016), Japanese-American landscape architect
, Japanese painter
Takeo Yano, Japanese judoka
Takeo Yasuda (武雄, 1889–1964), general in the Imperial Japanese Army
Takeo Yoshikawa (猛夫, 1914–1993), Japanese spy

Fictional characters with the given name Takeo
Takeo Saeki (剛雄), software developer
Takeo Masaki, character in Call of Duty  zombies series
Otori Takeo, main character in the Tales of the Otori series by Lian Hearn
Takeo Gōda (剛田 猛男), main character from the manga series, My Love Story!! by Kazune Kawahara.
Takeo, mascot for the Nekocon anime convention
Takeo Ishiyama, supporting character of Code Lyoko in which he is father of dutiful Lyoko warrior Yumi Ishiyama
Takeo Sasaki, in the Marvel anime miniseries of X-Men the only child of Dr. Yui Sasaki and the immensely powerful telepath Charles Xavier

Japanese masculine given names

pl:Takeo (imię)